Prochoreutis hadrogastra is a moth in the family Choreutidae. It was described by Alexey Diakonoff in 1978. It is found in Japan and the Russian Far East.

The larvae feed on Leucosceptrum stellipilum.

References

Natural History Museum Lepidoptera generic names catalog

Prochoreutis
Moths described in 1978